Gary James Wellman (born August 9, 1967) is a former professional American football wide receiver in the National Football League.  Wellman played college football at the University of Southern California, where he caught 110 passes for 1,819 yards and 13 touchdowns.  As a senior, Wellman was the PAC-10's top receiver with 66 receptions for 1,015 yards and 5 scores.  He played three seasons for the Houston Oilers. He played little during his first and last season, but caught 31 passes in his second year when thrust into the starting line-up to replace the injured Webster Slaughter. He also caught 6 passes for 80 yards in their playoff loss to the Kansas City Chiefs.

References

1967 births
Living people
Players of American football from Syracuse, New York
American football wide receivers
USC Trojans football players
Houston Oilers players
University of Southern California alumni
Sportspeople from Ventura County, California